Djanogly City Academy City Academy secondary school in Nottingham, England. It has been open since 2003, when it replaced the oversubscribed Djanogly CTC, a City Technology College, which was then independent from local authority control. The academy specialises in the use of ICT and has been awarded the ICT Mark.

It is named after its sponsor, textile millionaire Sir Harry Djanogly.

Djanogly formerly operated on two sites – the 14–19 Centre in the old CTC building in Sherwood Rise, and the 11–14 Centre in a new building designed by Foster & Partners on the site of the former Forest Comprehensive School on Gregory Boulevard, opposite the Forest Recreation Ground. The Sherwood Rise site  now accommodates the primary aged children. However, towards the end of the school year, year 11 students are accommodated here to study and take their gcse examinations.

See also
Sir Harry and Lady Djanogly Learning Resource Centre at University of Nottingham

References

External links
 Djanogly City Academy website
 Trust website
 Trust Financial Statement
 

Academies in Nottingham
Educational institutions established in 1989
Educational charities based in the United Kingdom
Former city technology colleges
Secondary schools in Nottingham
1989 establishments in England